The 1980–81 FIBA European Champions Cup was the 24th season of the European top-tier level professional basketball club competition FIBA European Champions Cup (now called EuroLeague). The Final was held at the Hall Rhénus, in Strasbourg, France, on March 26, 1981. In a tightly contested game, Maccabi Elite Tel Aviv defeated Sinudyne Bologna, by a result of 80–79.

Competition system

 Twenty-four teams (European national domestic league champions, plus the then current title holders), playing in a tournament system, entered a Quarterfinals group stage, divided into six groups that played in a round-robin. The final standing was based on individual wins and defeats. In the case of a tie between two or more teams after the group stage, the following criteria were used to decide the final classification:
 number of wins in one-to-one games between the teams;
 basket average between the teams;
 general basket average within the group.
 The six group winners of the Quarterfinals group stage advanced to the Semifinals group stage, which was played as a single group under the same round-robin rules.
 The group winner and the runner-up of the Semifinals group stage qualified for the final, which was played at a predetermined venue.

Quarterfinals group stage

Semifinals group stage

Final
March 26, Hall Rhénus, Strasbourg

|}

Awards

FIBA European Champions Cup Finals Top Scorer
 Marco Bonamico ( Sinudyne Bologna)

References

External links
1980–81 FIBA European Champions Cup
 1980–81 FIBA European Champions Cup
 Men Basketball European Champions Cup 1981
 Champions Cup 1980–81 Line-ups and Stats

EuroLeague seasons
FIBA